Multivariable calculus (also known as multivariate calculus) is the extension of calculus in one variable to calculus with functions of several variables: the differentiation and integration of functions involving multiple variables (multivariate), rather than just one. 

Multivariable calculus may be thought of as an elementary part of advanced calculus. For advanced calculus, see calculus on Euclidean space. The special case of calculus in three dimensional space is often called vector calculus.

Typical operations

Limits and continuity
A study of limits and continuity in multivariable calculus yields many counterintuitive results not demonstrated by single-variable functions.  For example, there are scalar functions of two variables with points in their domain which give different limits when approached along different paths. E.g., the function.

approaches zero whenever the point  is approached along lines through the origin. Since taking different paths toward the same point yields different limit values, a general limit does not exist there.

Continuity in each argument not being sufficient for multivariate continuity can also be seen from the following example.

Consider

It is easy to verify that this function is zero by definition on the boundary and outside of the quadrangle .
 and 
are continuous. Specifically,

Approaching the origin not along parallels to the - and -axis reveals this discontinuity.

Continuity of function composition

For examples,  and

Properties of continuous functions

(i)  are continuous at 

(iii)    is continuous at point 

(iv)   is continuous at  if  

(v)   is continuous at

Partial differentiation

The partial derivative generalizes the notion of the derivative to higher dimensions.  A partial derivative of a multivariable function is a derivative with respect to one variable with all other variables held constant.

Partial derivatives may be combined in interesting ways to create   more complicated expressions of the derivative.  In vector calculus, the del operator is used to define the concepts of gradient, divergence, and curl in terms of partial derivatives.  A matrix of partial derivatives, the Jacobian matrix, may be used to represent the derivative of a function between two spaces of arbitrary dimension.  The derivative can thus be understood as a linear transformation which directly varies from point to point in the domain of the function.

Differential equations containing partial derivatives are called partial differential equations or PDEs.  These equations are generally more difficult to solve than ordinary differential equations, which contain derivatives with respect to only one variable.

Multiple integration

The multiple integral expands the concept of the integral to functions of any number of variables. Double and triple integrals may be used to calculate areas and volumes of regions in the plane and in space.  Fubini's theorem guarantees that a multiple integral may be evaluated as a repeated integral or iterated integral as long as the integrand is continuous throughout the domain of integration.

The surface integral and the line integral are used to integrate over curved manifolds such as surfaces and curves.

Fundamental theorem of calculus in multiple dimensions
In single-variable calculus, the fundamental theorem of calculus establishes a link between the derivative and the integral.  The link between the derivative and the integral in multivariable calculus is embodied by the integral theorems of vector calculus:
 Gradient theorem
 Stokes' theorem
 Divergence theorem
 Green's theorem.

In a more advanced study of multivariable calculus, it is seen that these four theorems are specific incarnations of a more general theorem, the generalized Stokes' theorem, which applies to the integration of differential forms over manifolds.

Applications and uses
Techniques of multivariable calculus are used to study many objects of interest in the material world. In particular,

Multivariable calculus can be applied to analyze deterministic systems that have multiple degrees of freedom.  Functions with independent variables corresponding to each of the degrees of freedom are often used to model these systems, and multivariable calculus provides tools for characterizing the system dynamics.

Multivariate calculus is used in the optimal control of continuous time dynamic systems. It is used in regression analysis to derive formulas for estimating relationships among various sets of empirical data.

Multivariable calculus is used in many fields of natural and social science and engineering to model and study high-dimensional systems that exhibit deterministic behavior.  In economics, for example, consumer choice over a variety of goods, and producer choice over various inputs to use and outputs to produce, are modeled with multivariate calculus. 

Non-deterministic, or stochastic systems can be studied using a different kind of mathematics, such as stochastic calculus.

See also 
 List of multivariable calculus topics
 Multivariate statistics

References

External links

 UC Berkeley video lectures on Multivariable Calculus, Fall 2009, Professor Edward Frenkel
 MIT video lectures on Multivariable Calculus, Fall 2007
 Multivariable Calculus: A free online textbook by George Cain and James Herod
 Multivariable Calculus Online: A free online textbook by Jeff Knisley
 Multivariable Calculus – A Very Quick Review, Prof. Blair Perot, University of Massachusetts Amherst
 Multivariable Calculus, Online text by Dr. Jerry Shurman